Hostavice became part of Prague in 1968. Now it is part of the district of Prague 9 (Prague 14) and is a cadastral area on its own.

The area is 1,98 km2, the population is 2 707 and the population density is 1 367 inhabitants / km2.

There is château, nature park (Klánovice-Čihadla) and nature reserve (V Pískovně).

Most of inhabitants of cadastral area of Hostavice live in settlement Jahodnice.

Neighboring cadastral areas 

 Černý Most
 Kyje
 Štěrboholy
 Dolní Počernice

References 

Districts of Prague